Boye Habekost (born 22 September 1968) is a Danish football coach and a former player who is manager at Give Fremad

External links
  DBU statistics
  BT: Habekost stopper
  Boye Habekost ny træner i Give Fremad

1968 births
Living people
Danish men's footballers
Danish football managers
Vejle Boldklub players
Esbjerg fB players
FC Fredericia players
Kolding IF managers
People from Fredericia
Association football goalkeepers
Sportspeople from the Region of Southern Denmark